The Hmongic languages, also known as Miao languages, include the various languages spoken by the Miao people (such as Hmong, Hmu, and Xong). Hmongic languages also include various languages spoken by non-Mienic-speaking Yao people, such as Pa-Hng, Bunu, Jiongnai, Younuo, and others, while She is spoken by ethnic She people.

Names
Miao is the Chinese name and the one used by Miao in China. However, Hmong is more familiar in the West, due to Hmong emigration. Hmong is the biggest subgroup within the Hmongic peoples. Many overseas Hmong prefer the name Hmong, and claim that Meo (a Southeast Asian language change from Miao) is both inaccurate and pejorative, though it is generally considered neutral by the Miao community in China.

Of the core Hmongic languages spoken by ethnic Miao, there are a number of overlapping names. The three branches are as follows, as named by Purnell (in English and Chinese), Ratliff, and scholars in China, as well as the descriptive names based on the patterns and colors of traditional dress:

The Hunan Province Gazetteer (1997) gives the following autonyms for various peoples in Hunan classified by the Chinese government as Miao.
Luxi County and Guzhang County: , 
Jingzhou County, Huaihua: ,
Chengbu County, Shaoyang: Hmao

Classification
Hmongic is one of the primary branches of the Hmong–Mien language family, with the other being Mienic. Hmongic is a diverse group of perhaps twenty languages, based on mutual intelligibility, but several of these are dialectically quite diverse in phonology and vocabulary, and are not considered to be single languages by their speakers. There are probably over thirty languages taking this into account. Four classifications are outlined below, though the details of the West Hmongic branch are left for that article.

Mo Piu, first documented in 2009, was reported by Geneviève Caelen-Haumont (2011) to be a divergent Hmongic language, and was later determined to be a dialect of Guiyang Miao. Similarly, Ná-Meo is not addressed in the classifications below, but is believed by Nguyen (2007) to be closest to Hmu (Qiandong Miao).

Strecker (1987)
Strecker's classification is as follows:

 Hmongic (Miao)
West Hunan = Xong = Xiangxi (Northern Hmongic)
East Guizhou = Mhu = Qiandong (Eastern Hmongic)
Pa Hng
Hm Nai = Wunai
Kiong Nai = Jiongnai
Yu Nuo = Younuo
Sichuan–Guizhou–Yunnan = Chuanqiangdian (Western Hmongic, including Bu–Nao) (See)

In a follow-up to that paper in the same publication, Strecker tentatively removed Pa-Hng, Wunai, Jiongnai, and Yunuo, positing that they may be independent branches of Miao–Yao, with the possibility that Yao was the first of these to branch off. Effectively, this means that Miao/Hmongic would consist of six branches: She (Ho-Nte), Pa-Hng, Wunai, Jiongnai, Yunuo, and everything else. In addition, the 'everything else' would include nine distinct but unclassified branches, which were not addressed by either Matisoff or Ratliff (see West Hmongic#Strecker).

Matisoff (2001)
Matisoff followed the basic outline of Strecker (1987), apart from consolidating the Bunu languages and leaving She unclassified:

 Hmongic (Miao)
 Bunu
 Younuo
 Wunai
 Bu–Nao: Pu No, Nao Klao, Nu Mhou, Nunu, Tung Nu
 Jiongnai
 Chuanqiangdian Miao (See)
 Pa-Hng
 Qiandong Miao (Hmu, 3 languages)
 Xiangxi Miao (Xong, 2 languages)

Wang & Deng (2003)
Wang & Deng (2003) is one of the few Chinese sources which integrate the Bunu languages into Hmongic on purely linguistic grounds. They find the following pattern in the statistics of core Swadesh vocabulary:

She
 (main branch)
 (Hunan–Guangxi)
Jiongnai
 (other)
Western Hunan (Northern Hmongic / Xong)
Younuo–Pa-Hng
 (Guizhou–Yunnan)
Eastern Guizhou (Eastern Hmongic / Hmu)
(Western)
Bu–Nao
Western Hmongic
A-Hmao
Hmong

Matisoff (2006)
Matisoff (2006) outlined the following. Not all varieties are listed.

 Northern Hmong = West Hunan (Xong)
 Western Hmong (See)
 Central Hmong
Longli Miao
Guizhu
 Eastern Guizhou (Hmu)
Daigong
Kaili (= Northern)
Lushan
Taijiang (= Northern)
Zhenfeng (= Northern)
Phö
Rongjiang (= Southern)
Patengic
 Pateng
 Yongcong

Matisoff also indicates Hmongic influence on Gelao in his outline.

Ratliff (2010)
The Hmongic classification below is from Martha Ratliff (2010:3).

Hmongic (Miao)
Pa-Hng – 32,000 speakers
Main branch
Kiong Nai – 1,100 speakers
She – 910 speakers
Core Hmongic
West Hmongic (Chuanqiandian)
Hmong – 3,712,000 speakers
Gha-Mu - 84,000 speakers
A-Hmao – 300,000 speakers in Guizhou and Yunnan
Bu–Nao – 390,000 speakers in Guangxi
Gejia - 60,000 speakers
A-Hmyo - 61,000 speakers
Mashan - 140,000 speakers
Guiyang - 190,000 speakers
Huishui - 180,000 speakers
Pingtang - 24,000 speakers
Xong – 900,000 speakers mostly in Hunan
Hmu – 2,100,000 speakers mostly in Guizhou

Ratliff (2010) notes that Pa-Hng, Jiongnai, and Xong (North Hmongic) are phonologically conservative, as they retain many Proto-Hmongic features that have been lost in most other daughter languages. For instance, both Pa-Hng and Xong have vowel quality distinctions (and also tone distinctions in Xong) depending on whether or not the Proto-Hmong-Mien rime was open or closed. Both also retain the second part of Proto-Hmong-Mien diphthongs, which is lost in most other Hmongic languages, since they tend to preserve only the first part of Proto-Hmong-Mien diphthongs. Ratliff notes that the position of Xong (North Hmongic) is still quite uncertain. Since Xong preserves many archaic features not found in most other Hmongic languages, any future attempts at classifying the Hmong-Mien languages must also address the position of Xong.

Taguchi (2012)
Yoshihisa Taguchi's (2012, 2013) computational phylogenetic study classifies the Hmongic languages as follows.

Hmongic
Pahngic
Pa Hng
Northern
Xong
Core Hmongic
Central
Hmu
Western
Hmong–Hmyo
Hmong 
Hmyo
Pu Nu – Nao Klao
Pu Nu
Nao Klao
Eastern
Kiong Nai
Ho Ne – Pana
Ho Ne
Pana

Hsiu (2015, 2018)
Hsiu's (2015, 2018) computational phylogenetic study classifies the Hmongic languages as follows, based primarily on lexical data from Chen (2013).

Hmongic
Pahengic
Pa Hng
Hm Nai
Xiongic
Western (Xiong)
Eastern (Suang)
Sheic
She–Jiongnai
Younuo
Pana
Hmuic
North-East
West (Raojia)
South
West Hmongic
Bu–Nao
Bunu
Nao Klao
Numao
Hmong (Chuanqiandian)
(various)

Comparison

Writing

The Hmongic languages have been written with at least a dozen different scripts, none of which has been universally accepted among Hmong people as standard. Tradition has it that the ancestors of the Hmong, the Nanman, had a written language with a few pieces of significant literature. When the Han-era Chinese began to expand southward into the land of the Hmong, whom they considered barbarians, the script of the Hmong was lost, according to many stories. Allegedly, the script was preserved in the clothing. Attempts at revival were made by the creation of a script in the Qing Dynasty, but this was also brutally suppressed and no remnant literature has been found. Adaptations of Chinese characters have been found in Hunan, recently. However, this evidence and mythological understanding is disputed. For example, according to Professor S. Robert Ramsey, there was no writing system among the Miao until the missionaries created them. It is currently unknown for certain whether or not the Hmong had a script historically.

Around 1905, Samuel Pollard introduced the Pollard script, for the A-Hmao language, an abugida inspired by Canadian Aboriginal Syllabics, by his own admission. Several other syllabic alphabets were designed as well, the most notable being Shong Lue Yang's Pahawh Hmong script, which originated in Laos for the purpose of writing Hmong Daw, Hmong Njua, and other dialects of the standard Hmong language.

In the 1950s, pinyin-based Latin alphabets were devised by the Chinese government for three varieties of Miao: Xong, Hmu, and Chuangqiandian (Hmong), as well as a Latin alphabet for A-Hmao to replace the Pollard script (now known as "Old Miao"), though Pollard remains popular. This meant that each of the branches of Miao in the classification of the time had a separate written standard. Wu and Yang (2010) believe that standards should be developed for each of the six other primary varieties of Chuangqiandian as well, although the position of Romanization in the scope of Hmong language preservation remains a debate. Romanization remains common in China and the United States, while versions of the Lao and Thai scripts remain common in Thailand and Laos.

Nyiakeng Puachue Hmong script was created by Reverend Chervang Kong Vang to be able to capture Hmong vocabulary clearly and also to remedy redundancies in the language as well as address semantic confusions that was lacking in other scripts. This was created in the 1980s and was mainly used by United Christians Liberty Evangelical Church, a church also founded by Vang. The script bears strong resemblance to the Lao alphabet in structure and form and characters inspired from the Hebrew alphabets, although the characters themselves are different.

Mixed languages
Due to intensive language contact, there are several language varieties in China which are thought to be mixed Miao–Chinese languages or Sinicized Miao. These include:

Lingling (Linghua) of northern Guangxi
The Maojia dialect (also called Aoka or Qingyi Miao) of Chengbu Miao Autonomous County, Hunan and Ziyun, Longsheng Various Nationalities Autonomous County, Guangxi, which is located near Pana-speaking villages.
Badong Yao 八峒瑶 of Xinning County, Hunan
Laba 喇叭: more than 200,000 in Qinglong, Shuicheng, Pu'an, and Panxian in Guizhou; a variety of Old Xiang (also called Lou-Shao 娄邵片). The people are also called Huguangren 湖广人, because they claim their ancestors had migrated from Huguang (modern-day Hunan and Hubei).
Baishi Miao 拜师苗 of Baishi District, Tianzhu County, eastern Guizhou, possibly a mixed Chinese and Miao (Hmu) language
Sanqiao, a mixed Hmu-Kam (Miao-Dong) language of southeastern Guizhou

Other divergent Sinitic language varieties spoken by Miao peoples include:

Guanxia Pinghua 关峡平话, spoken in Suining County, Hunan
Yangshi Pinghua 羊石平话, spoken in Chengbu County, Hunan
Lanrong 兰蓉人话, spoken in Chengbu County, Hunan
Wutuan 五团人话, spoken in Chengbu County, Hunan
Mama 麻林人话, spoken in Xinning County, Hunan
Niutou 牛头人话, spoken in Longsheng County, Guangxi

See also
 List of Proto-Hmong-Mien reconstructions (Wiktionary)
 List of Proto-Hmongic reconstructions (Wiktionary)
 Hmong-Mien comparative vocabulary list (Wiktionary)

References

External links 
Li Jinping, Li Tianyi [李锦平, 李天翼]. 2012. A comparative study of Miao dialects [苗语方言比较研究]. Chengdu: Southwest Jiaotong University Press.
283-word wordlist recording in Wuding Maojie Hmong (Dianxi Miao) dialect (F, 31), elicited in Standard Mandarin, archived with Kaipuleohone.

 
Languages of China
Languages of Laos
Languages of Thailand